Andavadoaka Airport  is an airport in Andavadoaka, a town in the Toliara Province of the Atsimo-Andrefana region of Madagascar. It is located on the west coast of the island, south-west of the capital Antananarivo.

Airlines and destinations

References

Airports in Madagascar
Atsimo-Andrefana